In bifurcation theory, a field within mathematics, a Bogdanov–Takens bifurcation is a well-studied example of a bifurcation with co-dimension two, meaning that two parameters must be varied for the bifurcation to occur. It is named after Rifkat Bogdanov and Floris Takens, who independently and simultaneously described this bifurcation.

A system y''' = f(y) undergoes a Bogdanov–Takens bifurcation if it has a fixed point and the linearization of f around that point has a double eigenvalue at zero (assuming that some technical nondegeneracy conditions are satisfied).

Three codimension-one bifurcations occur nearby: a saddle-node bifurcation, an Andronov–Hopf bifurcation and a homoclinic bifurcation. All associated bifurcation curves meet at the Bogdanov–Takens bifurcation.

The normal form of the Bogdanov–Takens bifurcation is

There exist two codimension-three degenerate Takens–Bogdanov bifurcations, also known as Dumortier–Roussarie–Sotomayor bifurcations.

References
Bogdanov, R. "Bifurcations of a Limit Cycle for a Family of Vector Fields on the Plane." Selecta Math. Soviet 1, 373–388, 1981.
Kuznetsov, Y. A. Elements of Applied Bifurcation Theory. New York: Springer-Verlag, 1995.
Takens, F. "Forced Oscillations and Bifurcations." Comm. Math. Inst. Rijksuniv. Utrecht 2, 1–111, 1974.
Dumortier F., Roussarie R., Sotomayor J. and Zoladek H., Bifurcations of Planar Vector Fields'', Lecture Notes in Math. vol. 1480, 1–164, Springer-Verlag (1991).

External links
 

Bifurcation theory